Events from the year 1528 in Sweden

Incumbents
 Monarch – Gustav I

Events

 January 12 - King Gustav I is crowned in Uppsala, without the customary oath to confirm the power of the bishops.
 - The last Catholic arch bishop of Sweden, Johannes Magnus, leaves for Italy.
 - The Evangelical psalms of Olaus Petri is published. 
 - The customary fortress of the Finnish bishop is dismantled by royal decree. 
 - The King subdues the second of the Dalecarlian Rebellions: Christina Gyllenstierna is forced to write a public statement that the leader, the so-called Daljunkern ("The youngster from Dalarna"), was not her son, and that of all the sons she had with regent Sten, the only son alive was Svante. The Daljunkern flees abroad, where he is arrested an executed in Germany.

Births

Deaths

 - Nils Stensson Sture, rebel leader (born 1512)
 - Barbro Stigsdotter, heroine (born 1472)

References

 
Years of the 16th century in Sweden
Sweden